"You'll Be There" is a song written by Cory Mayo and recorded by American country music singer George Strait. It was released in March 2005 as the lead single from the album, Somewhere Down in Texas. It peaked at number 4 on the U.S. Billboard Hot Country Singles & Tracks chart and number 54 on the U.S. Billboard Hot 100 chart.

Content
The song is an ode to a person who has died. The narrator talks about their journey to get to Heaven and that they'll see each other on the "other side" when the time comes.

Critical reception
In his review of the album, Ray Waddell of Billboard called it "the kind of languid big-picture [ballad] that he just kills". An uncredited review in the Plainview Daily Herald called the song "much more ambitious than the usual George Strait tune". Greg Crawford of Knight Ridder News Service wrote that it had "moving but never maudlin lyrics" and "is the clear standout" of the album.

Chart positions
"You'll Be There" debuted at number 30 on the U.S. Billboard Hot Country Songs for the week of April 9, 2005.

Year-end charts

References

2005 singles
George Strait songs
Song recordings produced by Tony Brown (record producer)
MCA Nashville Records singles
2005 songs